Ruby Blaine (August 27, 1903–May, 1976) was an American film actress of the silent era.

Partial filmography

 The Midnight Girl (1925)
 Headlines (1925)
 Children of the Whirlwind (1925)
 Bluebeard's Seven Wives (1926)
 Lightning Lariats (1927)
 Bitter Apples (1927)
 The Terror of Bar X (1927)
 Gun-Hand Garrison (1927)
 Two Tars (1928, short)

References

Bibliography
 Munden, Kenneth White. The American Film Institute Catalog of Motion Pictures Produced in the United States, Part 1. University of California Press, 1997.

External links

1903 births
1976 deaths
American film actresses
American silent film actresses
20th-century American actresses
People from Hutchinson, Kansas